Schismatorhynchos endecarhapis is a species of cyprinid in the genus Schismatorhynchos. It inhabits Indonesia and is considered harmless to humans.

References

Cyprinid fish of Asia
Freshwater fish of Indonesia